John Hampton (born December 6, 1966) is an American politician who has served in the Connecticut House of Representatives from the 16th district since 2013.

References

1966 births
Living people
People from Simsbury, Connecticut
Democratic Party members of the Connecticut House of Representatives
21st-century American politicians